Major General Richard Roderick Davis,  (born 2 August 1962) is a retired British Army officer and author who has worked extensively in sub-Saharan Africa. He is currently the Managing Director of Nant Enterprises and a Special Advisor to the Johannesburg-based Brenthurst Foundation.

Military career
Educated at Bloxham School, Davis studied for a degree in civil engineering at the Royal Military College of Science before attending the Royal Military Academy Sandhurst and being commissioned into the Royal Engineers in 1984. Following service as a junior officer he attended the Army Staff Course gaining an MSc in Defence Technology. He served as commanding officer of 22 Engineer Regiment in which role he was deployed to Kosovo and subsequently to West Yorkshire to provide firefighting cover as part of Operation Fresco. In June 2003 he set up and led the first UK Provincial Reconstruction Team in Mazar-e-Sharif, Northern Afghanistan. The team established a ceasefire between the rival warlords Atta Muhammad Nur and General Abdul Rashid Dostum and started a disarmament process. Davis subsequently returned to Afghanistan as the ISAF Chief Engineer between 2006 and 2007, and again as Chief of Staff, Regional Command South (Kandahar) between 2009 and 2010. Davis commanded the Army Recruiting and Training Division from 2011 until 2013. His final military appointment was Director General Personnel from which he retired in 2015.

Davis retains a number of Honorary appointments. He is a Colonel Commandant of the Royal Engineers and Honorary Colonel of the Royal Monmouthshire Royal Engineers (Militia).

Works 
Davis has taken to writing in his retirement. His works include:

 (contributor)

References

1962 births
British Army major generals
Commanders of the Order of the British Empire
Companions of the Order of the Bath
Living people
Royal Engineers officers
Military personnel from Hampshire
Recipients of the Commendation for Valuable Service